Gigant is a rural locality in Salsky District of Rostov Oblast, Russia.

Climate

References

Rural localities in Rostov Oblast